Michalis Kyritsis (alternate spellings: Mihalis, Kiritsis) (2 September 1945) is a Greek former professional basketball player and coach. During his playing career, at a height of 1.80 m (5'11") tall, he played at the point guard position.

Playing career
Kyritsis began playing youth club basketball with the youth teams of Panathinaikos, in 1958. He began his pro career with the men's senior team, Panathinaikos, in 1963. With Panathinaikos, he won 5 Greek League championships, in the years 1967, 1969, 1971, 1972, and 1973.

Coaching career
After he ended his basketball playing career, Kyritsis began working as a basketball coach. He was the head coach of the following Greek basketball clubs: Panathinaikos, Panellinios, Panionios, Olympiacos, Aris, AEK Athens, Gymnastikos S. Larissas, Papagou, and Kolossos. With Panathinaikos, he won the Greek League championship in 1984, and the Greek Cup, in 1986. With Aris, he won the Greek League championship in 1991.

Administrative career
Kyritsis was the General Director of the Greek Basket League, from 2003 to 2004. He was also the general manager of PAOK.

Personal life
Krytsis' son, Alexis, is a professional basketball player. Both Michalis and his son played with Panathinaikos.

References

External links 
Michalis Kyritsis at basket.gr 
Michalis Kyritsis at basketspake.com 

1945 births
AEK B.C. coaches
Aris B.C. coaches
Greek basketball coaches
Greek basketball executives and administrators
Greek men's basketball players
Gymnastikos S. Larissas B.C. coaches
Kolossos Rodou B.C. coaches
Olympiacos B.C. coaches
Panathinaikos B.C. coaches
Panathinaikos B.C. players
Panionios B.C. coaches
Panellinios B.C. coaches
Papagou B.C. coaches
Peiraikos Syndesmos B.C. coaches
Point guards
Living people
Basketball players from Athens